Benjamin T. Orifici is an American film director, screenwriter, cinematographer, and editor. 
He is the co-founder of the film production company, Celluloid Rain Productions based in Brooklyn, New York and Paris, France.  His feature films include Carroll Park (2013) and Brooklyn Breach (2012).

References

External links

American film directors
American male screenwriters
American cinematographers
Living people
Year of birth missing (living people)
American film editors